Saint John's International School (SJIS) is an international school located in Kuala Lumpur. This school is privately funded, and has collaboration with the La Salle brothers. Learning runs from lower secondary up to the A levels.

Admissions
Students must have at least 5 credits in SPM/IGCSE/GCE O Level subjects, including English. Students opting for a science subjects must have credits for science subjects at SPM/IGCSE/GCE O Level. Students opting for further mathematics courses must have a credit in additional mathematics at SPM/IGCSE/GCE O Level. They will be required to sit for a Direct English Placement test during the admission.

Facilities
Library
Multipurpose outdoor court (Futsal and Tennis)
Two Science Labs (Physics lab and Chemistry Biology Lab)
ICT lab
Washrooms
Air Conditioned Classrooms
Canteen

Levels and grades
Lower secondary [Year 7-9]
Upper secondary/IGCSE [Year 10-11]
A levels [Year 12]

After school classes
Chinese class (Offered by Language Tree)
Extra classes
French class
 Computer programming class
German class

ECA/CCA
ECA and CCA are extra curricular lessons. ECAs are clubs, such as Saint John's Ambulance Malaysia and Nature Club. CCAs has much examples, such as football and basketball.

References

External links

Educational institutions established in 2010
2010 establishments in Malaysia
Cambridge schools in Malaysia